Paden Island is an island in Wetzel County, West Virginia on the Ohio River between Sardis, Ohio and Paden City, West Virginia. Paden Island is a part of the Ohio River Islands National Wildlife Refuge.

See also 
List of islands of West Virginia

References 

River islands of West Virginia
Landforms of Wetzel County, West Virginia
Islands of the Ohio River